The ninth series of Geordie Shore, a British television programme based in Newcastle upon Tyne, was confirmed on 12 July 2014, and began on 28 October 2014. It was also announced that the cast would travel to Paris and Somerset. All cast members from the previous series returned. Before the series launch, cast member Vicky Pattison announced that this would be her final series. She had appeared in the show since the first series.

Cast
Aaron Chalmers
Charlotte-Letitia Crosby
Gary Beadle
Holly Hagan
James Tindale
Kyle Christie
Marnie Simpson
Scott Timlin
Vicky Pattison

Duration of cast 

 = Cast member is featured in this episode.
 = Cast member voluntarily leaves the house.
 = Cast member leaves and returns to the house in the same episode.
 = Cast member returns to the house.
 = Cast member leaves the series.

Episodes

Ratings

References

2014 British television seasons
Series 09